Heart of Gold, sometimes called Golden Heart is the studio album by Soviet singer-songwriter Sofia Rotaru, released in July 1988 by Melodiya. The long play album was simultaneously released for the Soviet and international market. The album includes songs performed in Russian with new rock style arrangements by Vladimir Matetsky.

Track listing

Side A

Side B

Album credits

Personnel

Production

Design
Art direction, cover design: M. Afanasiev
Photography: B. Asriev

Certifications, peaks & sales

References 

1988 albums
1988 in the Soviet Union
Sofia Rotaru albums